William Beatty may refer to:
Sir William Beatty (surgeon) (1773–1842), Irish surgeon in the Royal Navy
William Beatty (Ontario politician) (1835–1898), member of the 1st Parliament of Ontario
William Henry Beatty (1833–1912), Ontario lawyer and businessman
William Rabb Beatty (1851–1905), Ontario businessman
William H. Beatty (1838–1914), former Chief Justice of the Supreme Court of California
William Beatty (Pennsylvania politician) (1787–1851), U.S. Representative from Pennsylvania
Will Beatty (born 1985), American football offensive tackle
William L. Beatty (1925–2001), U.S. federal judge

See also
William Beattie (disambiguation)
William Beattie Nesbitt (1866–1913), Ontario physician and political figure